Jesus and the woman taken in adultery (or the ) is a passage (pericope) found in John 7:53–8:11 of the New Testament.

In the passage, Jesus was teaching in the Second Temple after coming from the Mount of Olives. A group of scribes and Pharisees confronts Jesus, interrupting his teaching. They bring in a woman, accusing her of committing adultery, claiming she was caught in the very act. They tell Jesus that the punishment for someone like her should be stoning, as prescribed by Mosaic Law. Jesus begins to write something on the ground using his finger; when the woman's accusers continue their challenge, he states that the one who is without sin is the one who should cast the first stone at her. The accusers and congregants depart, realizing not one of them is without sin either, leaving Jesus alone with the woman. Jesus asks the woman if anyone has condemned her and she answers no. Jesus says that he, too, does not condemn her, and tells her to go and sin no more.

There is now a broad academic consensus that the passage is a later interpolation added after the earliest known manuscripts of the Gospel of John. Although it is included in most modern translations (one notable exception being the New World Translation of the Holy Scriptures) it is typically noted as a later interpolation, as it is by Novum Testamentum Graece NA28. This has been the view of "most NT scholars, including most evangelical NT scholars, for well over a century" (written in 2009). The passage appears to have been included in some texts by the 4th century, and became generally accepted by the 5th century.

The passage
John 7:53–8:11 in the New Revised Standard Version:

Interpretation
This episode, and its message of mercy and forgiveness balanced with a call to holy living, have endured in Christian thought. Both "let him who is without sin, cast the first stone" and "go, and sin no more" have found their way into common usage. The English idiomatic phrase to "cast the first stone" is derived from this passage.

The passage has been taken as confirmation of Jesus' ability to write, otherwise only suggested by implication in the Gospels, but the word  in John 8:8 could mean "draw" as well as "write".

History of textual criticism

The first to systematically apply the critical marks of the Alexandrian critics was Origen:

Early textual critics familiar with the use and meaning of these marks in classical Greek works like Homer, interpreted the signs to mean that the section (John 7:53–8:11) was an interpolation and not an original part of the Gospel.

During the 16th century, Western European scholars – both Catholic and Protestant – sought to recover the most correct Greek text of the New Testament, rather than relying on the Vulgate Latin translation. At this time, it was noticed that a number of early manuscripts containing the Gospel of John lacked John 7:53–8:11 inclusive; and also that some manuscripts containing the verses marked them with critical signs, usually a lemniscus or asterisk. It was also noted that, in the lectionary of the Greek church, the Gospel-reading for Pentecost runs from John 7:37 to 8:12, but skips over the twelve verses of this pericope.

Beginning with Karl Lachmann (in Germany, 1840), reservations about the  became more strongly argued in the modern period, and these opinions were carried into the English world by Samuel Davidson (1848–51), Samuel Prideaux Tregelles (1862), and others; the argument against the verses being given body and final expression in F. J. A. Hort (1886). Those opposing the authenticity of the verses as part of John are represented in the 20th century by men like Henry Cadbury (1917), Ernest Cadman Colwell (1935), and Bruce M. Metzger (1971).

According to 19th-century text critics Henry Alford and F. H. A. Scrivener the passage was added by John in a second edition of the Gospel along with 5:3.4 and the 21st chapter.

On the other hand, a number of scholars have strongly defended the Johannine authorship of these verses. This group of critics is typified by such scholars as Frederick Nolan (1865), and John Burgon (1886), and Herman C. Hoskier (1920). More recently it has been defended by David Otis Fuller (1975), and is included in the Greek New Testaments compiled by Wilbur Pickering (1980/2014), Hodges & Farstad (1982/1985), and Robinson & Pierpont (2005). Rather than endorsing Augustine's theory that some men had removed the passage due to a concern that it would be used by their wives as a pretext to commit adultery, Burgon proposed (but did not develop in detail) a theory that the passage had been lost due to a misunderstanding of a feature in the lection-system of the early church.

Almost all modern critical translations that include the pericope adulterae do so at John 7:53–8:11. Exceptions include the New English Bible and Revised English Bible, which relocate the pericope after the end of the Gospel. Most others enclose the pericope in brackets, or add a footnote mentioning the absence of the passage in the oldest witnesses (e.g., NRSV, NJB, NIV, GNT, NASB, ESV).

Textual history 

According to Eusebius of Caesarea (in his Ecclesiastical History, composed in the early 300s), Papias refers to a story of Jesus and a woman "accused of many sins" as being found in the Gospel of the Hebrews, which might refer to this passage or to one like it. In the Syriac , composed in the mid-200s, the author, in the course of instructing bishops to exercise a measure of clemency, states that a bishop who does not receive a repentant person would be doing wrong – "for you do not obey our Savior and our God, to do as He also did with her that had sinned, whom the elders set before Him, and leaving the judgment in His hands, departed. But He, the searcher of hearts, asked her and said to her, 'Have the elders condemned thee, my daughter?' She said to Him, 'No, Lord.' And He said unto her, 'Go your way; neither do I condemn thee.' In Him therefore, our Savior and King and God, be your pattern, O bishops."

Further, Didymus the Blind (c. 313–398) states that "We find in certain gospels" an episode in which a woman was accused of a sin, and was about to be stoned, but Jesus intervened "and said to those who were about to cast stones, 'He who has not sinned, let him take a stone and throw it. If anyone is conscious in himself not to have sinned, let him take a stone and smite her.' And no one dared," and so forth. Codex Fuldensis, which was produced in AD 546, and which, in the Gospels, features an unusual arrangement of the text that was found in an earlier document, contains the adulterae pericope, in the form in which it was written in the Vulgate. More significantly, Codex Fuldensis also preserves the chapter-headings of its earlier source-document (thought by some researchers to echo the Diatessaron produced by Tatian in the 170's), and the title of chapter 120 refers specifically to the woman taken in adultery.

Pacian of Barcelona (bishop from 365 to 391), in the course of making a rhetorical challenge, opposes cruelty as he sarcastically endorses it: "O Novatians, why do you delay to ask an eye for an eye? [...] Kill the thief. Stone the petulant. Choose not to read in the Gospel that the Lord spared even the adulteress who confessed, when none had condemned her." Pacian was a contemporary of the scribes who made Codex Sinaiticus.

The writer known as Ambrosiaster, mentioned the occasion when Jesus "spared her who had been apprehended in adultery." The unknown author of the composition "Apologia David" (thought by some analysts to be Ambrose, but more probably not) mentioned that people could be initially taken aback by the passage in which "we see an adulteress presented to Christ and sent away without condemnation." Later in the same composition he referred to this episode as a "lection" in the Gospels, indicating that it was part of the annual cycle of readings used in the church-services.

Sedulius and Gelasius also clearly used the passage. Prosper of Aquitaine, and Quodvultdeus of Carthage, in the mid-400s, utilized the passage.

A text called the Second Epistle of Pope Callistus, section 6, contains a quote that may be from John 8:11 – "Let him see to it that he sin no more, that the sentence of the Gospel may abide in him: "Go, and sin no more."" However this text also appears to quote from eighth-century writings and therefore is most likely spurious.

In the Codex Vaticanus, which was produced in the early 300s, perhaps in Egypt (or in Caesarea, by copyists using exemplars from Egypt), the text is marked at the end of John chapter 7 with an umlaut in the margin, indicating that an alternative reading was known at this point.

The Latin Vulgate Gospel of John, produced by Jerome in 383, was based on the Greek manuscripts which Jerome considered ancient exemplars at that time and which contained the passage. This is confirmed by some Latin Fathers of the 300s and 400s, including Ambrose of Milan, and Augustine of Hippo. The latter claimed that the passage may have been improperly excluded from some manuscripts in order to avoid the impression that Christ had sanctioned adultery:

The pericope does not occur in the Greek Gospel manuscripts from Egypt. The Pericope Adulterae is not in 𝔓66 or in 𝔓75, both of which have been assigned to the late 100s or early 200s, nor in two important manuscripts produced in the early or mid 300s, Sinaiticus and Vaticanus. The first surviving Greek manuscript to contain the pericope is the Latin-Greek diglot Codex Bezae, produced in the 400s or 500s (but displaying a form of text which has affinities with "Western" readings used in the 100s and 200s). Codex Bezae is also the earliest surviving Latin manuscript to contain it. Out of 23 Old Latin manuscripts of John 7–8, seventeen contain at least part of the pericope, and represent at least three transmission-streams in which it was included.

However, in 1941 a large collection of the Greek writings of Didymus the Blind (313–398 AD) was discovered in Egypt, in which Didymus states that "We find in certain gospels" an episode in which a woman was accused of a sin, and was about to be stoned, but Jesus intervened "and said to those who were about to cast stones, 'He who has not sinned, let him take a stone and throw it. If anyone is conscious in himself not to have sinned, let him take a stone and smite her.' And no one dared," and so forth. As Didymus was referring to the Gospels typically used in the churches in his time, this reference appears to establish that the passage was accepted as authentic and commonly present in many Greek manuscripts known in Alexandria and elsewhere from the 300s onwards.

The subject of Jesus' writing on the ground was fairly common in art, especially from the Renaissance onwards, with examples by artists including those a painting by Pieter Bruegel and a drawing by Rembrandt. This is very probably a matter of guesswork based on Jeremiah 17:13. There have been other theories about what Jesus would have written.

Manuscripts

Various manuscripts treat, or include, the passage in a variety of ways. These can be categorised into those that exclude it entirely, those that exclude only a shortened version of the passage (including 7:53-8:2 but excluding 8:3-11), those that include only a shortened version of the passage (8:3–11), those that include the passage in full, those that question the passage, those that question only the shorter passage, those that relocate it to a different place within the Gospel of John, and those that mark it as having been added by a later hand.

Exclude the passage: Papyri 66 (c. 200 or 4th century) and 75 (early 3rd century or 4th century); Codices Sinaiticus and Vaticanus (4th century), also apparently Alexandrinus and Ephraemi (5th), Codices Washingtonianus and Borgianus also from the 5th century, Regius from the 8th (but with a blank space expressing the copyist's awareness of the passage), Athous Lavrensis (c. 800), Petropolitanus Purpureus, Macedoniensis, Sangallensis (with a distinct blank space) and Koridethi from the 9th century and Monacensis from the 10th; Uncials 0141 and 0211; Minuscules 3, 12, 15, 19, 21, 22, 31, 32, 33, 34, 36, 39, 44, 49, 63, 72, 77, 87, 96, 106, 108, 123, 124, 131, 134, 139, 151, 154, 157, 168, 169, 209, 213, 228, 249, 261, 269, 297, 303, 306, 315, 316, 317, 318, 333, 370, 388, 391, 392, 397, 401, 416, 423, 428, 430, 431, 445, 496, 499, 501, 523, 537, 542, 554, 565, 578, 584, 649, 684, 703, 713, 719, 723, 727, 729, 730, 731, 732, 733, 734, 736, 740, 741, 742, 743, 744, 749, 768, 770, 772, 773, 776, 777, 780, 794, 799, 800, 817, 818, 819, 820, 821, 827, 828, 831, 833, 834, 835, 836, 841, 843, 849, 850, 854, 855, 857, 862, 863, 865, 869, 896, 989, 1077, 1080, 1141 1178, 1230, 1241, 1242, 1253, 1256, 1261, 1262, 1326, 1333, 1357, 1593, 2106, 2193, 2244, 2768, 2862, 2900, 2901, 2907, 2957, 2965 and 2985; the majority of lectionaries; some Old Latin, the majority of the Syriac, the Sahidic dialect of the Coptic, the Garima Gospels and other Ethiopic witnesses, the Gothic, some Armenian, Georgian mss. of Adysh (9th century); Arabic mss of Diatessaron (2nd century); apparently Clement of Alexandria (died 215), other Church Fathers namely Tertullian (died 220), Origen (died 254), Cyprian (died 258), John Chrysostom (died 407), Nonnus (died 431), Cyril of Alexandria (died 444) and Cosmas (died 550).
 Shorter passage excluded (includes 7:53-8:2 but excludes 8:3-11): 228, 759, 1458, 1663, and 2533. 
 Shorter passage included (8:3–11): ℓ 4, ℓ 67, ℓ 69, ℓ 70, ℓ 71, ℓ 75, ℓ 81, ℓ 89, ℓ 90, ℓ 98, ℓ 101, ℓ 107, ℓ 125, ℓ 126, ℓ 139, ℓ 146, ℓ 185, ℓ 211, ℓ 217, ℓ 229, ℓ 267, ℓ 280, ℓ 282, ℓ 287, ℓ 376, ℓ 381, ℓ 386, ℓ 390, ℓ 396, ℓ 398, ℓ 402, ℓ 405, ℓ 409, ℓ 417, ℓ 422, ℓ 430, ℓ 431, ℓ 435 (8:2–11), ℓ 462, ℓ 464, ℓ 465, ℓ 520 (8:2–11).
Include passage: Codex Bezae (5th century), 9th century Codices Boreelianus, Seidelianus I, Seidelianus II, Cyprius, Campianus, Nanianus, also Tischendorfianus IV from the 10th, Codex Petropolitanus; Minuscule 28, 318, 700, 892, 1009, 1010, 1071, 1079, 1195, 1216, 1344, 1365, 1546, 1646, 2148, 2174; the Byzantine majority text; ℓ 79, ℓ 100 (John 8:1–11), ℓ 118, ℓ 130 (8:1–11), ℓ 221, ℓ 274, ℓ 281, ℓ 411, ℓ 421, ℓ 429 (8:1–11), ℓ 442 (8:1–11), ℓ 445 (8:1–11), ℓ 459; the majority of the Old Latin, the Vulgate, Western witnesses to the Diatessaron (Codex Fuldensis), some Syriac, the Bohairic dialect of the Coptic, some Armenian, Didascalia (3rd century), Didymus the Blind (4th century), Ambrosiaster (4th century), Ambrose (died 397), Jerome (died 420), Augustine (died 430).
Question pericope (marked with asterisks (※), obeli (÷), dash (–) or (<)): Codex Vaticanus 354 (S) and the Minuscules 18, 24, 35, 83, 95 (questionable scholion), 109, 125, 141, 148, 156, 161, 164, 165, 166, 167, 178, 179, 200, 201, 202, 285, 338, 348, 363, 367, 376, 386, 392, 407, 478, 479, 510, 532, 547, 553, 645, 655, 656, 661, 662, 685, 699, 757, 758, 763, 769, 781, 789, 797, 801, 824, 825, 829, 844, 845, 867, 897, 922, 1073, 1092 (later hand), 1187, 1189, 1280, 1443, 1445, 2099, and 2253 include entire pericope from 7:53; the menologion of Lectionary 185 includes 8:1ff; Codex Basilensis (E) includes 8:2ff; Codex Tischendorfianus III (Λ) and Petropolitanus (П) also the menologia of Lectionaries ℓ 86, ℓ 211, ℓ 1579 and ℓ 1761 include 8:3ff. Minuscule 807 is a manuscript with a Catena, but only in John 7:53–8:11 without catena. It is a characteristic of late Byzantine manuscripts conforming to the sub-type Family K, that this pericope is marked with obeli; although Maurice Robinson argues that these marks are intended to remind lectors that these verses are to be omitted from the Gospel lection for Pentecost, not to question the authenticity of the passage.
 Shorter passage questioned (8:3–11, marked with asterisks (※), obeli (÷) or (<)): 4, 8, 14, 443, 689, 707, 781, 873, 1517. (8:2-11) Codex Basilensis A. N. III. 12 (E) (8th century),
Relocate passage: Family 1, minuscules 20, 37, 135, 207, 301, 347, and nearly all Armenian translations place the pericope after John 21:25; Family 13 place it after Luke 21:38; a corrector to Minuscule 1333 added 8:3–11 after Luke 24:53; and Minuscule 225 includes the pericope after John 7:36. Minuscule 129, 135, 259, 470, 564, 1076, 1078, and 1356 place John 8:3–11 after John 21:25. 788 and Minuscule 826 placed pericope after Luke 21:38. 115, 552, 1349, and 2620 placed pericope after John 8:12.
Added by a later hand: Codex Ebnerianus, 19, 284, 431, 391, 461, 470, 501 (8:3-11), 578, 794, 1141, 1357, 1593, 2174, 2244, 2860.

The  was never read as a part of the lesson for the Pentecost cycle, but John 8:3–8:11 was reserved for the festivals of such saints as Theodora, 18 September, or Pelagia, 8 October.

Authorship

Arguments against Johannine authorship
Bishop J. B. Lightfoot wrote that absence of the passage from the earliest manuscripts, combined with the occurrence of stylistic characteristics atypical of John, together implied that the passage was an interpolation. Nevertheless, he considered the story to be authentic history. As a result, based on Eusebius' mention that the writings of Papias contained a story "about a woman falsely accused before the Lord of many sins" (H.E. 3.39), he argued that this section originally was part of Papias' Interpretations of the Sayings of the Lord, and included it in his collection of Papias' fragments. Bart D. Ehrman concurs in Misquoting Jesus, adding that the passage contains many words and phrases otherwise alien to John's writing. The evangelical Bible scholar Daniel B. Wallace agrees with Ehrman.

There are several excerpts from Papias that confirm this:
 
Fragment 1:
 And he relates another story of a woman, who was accused of many sins before the Lord, which is contained in the Gospel according to the Hebrews. These things we have thought it necessary to observe in addition to what has been already stated. 
Fragment 2:
 And there was at that time in Menbij [Hierapolis] a distinguished master who had many treatises, and he wrote five treatises on the Gospel. And he mentions in his treatise on the Gospel of John, that in the book of John the Evangelist, he speaks of a woman who was adulterous, so when they presented her to Christ our Lord, to whom be glory, He told the Jews who brought her to Him, “Whoever of you knows that he is innocent of what she has done, let him testify against her with what he has.” So when He told them that, none of them responded with anything and they left.
Fragment 3:
 The story of that adulterous woman, which other Christians have written in their gospel, was written about by a certain Papias, a student of John, who was declared a heretic and condemned.  Eusebius wrote about this. There are laws and that matter which Pilate, the king of the Jews, wrote of.  And it is said that he wrote in Hebrew with Latin and Greek above it.

However, Michael W. Holmes says that it is not certain "that Papias knew the story in precisely this form, inasmuch as it now appears that at least two independent stories about Jesus and a sinful woman circulated among Christians in the first two centuries of the church, so that the traditional form found in many New Testament manuscripts may well represent a conflation of two independent shorter, earlier versions of the incident." Kyle R. Hughes has argued that one of these earlier versions is in fact very similar in style, form, and content to the Lukan special material (the so-called "L" source), suggesting that the core of this tradition is in fact rooted in very early Christian (though not Johannine) memory.

Arguments for Johannine authorship
There is clear reference to the pericope adulterae in the primitive Christian church in the Syriac Didascalia Apostolorum. (II,24,6; ed. Funk I, 93.)

Zane C. Hodges and Arthur L. Farstad argue for Johannine authorship of the pericope. They suggest there are points of similarity between the pericope's style and the style of the rest of the gospel. They claim that the details of the encounter fit very well into the context of the surrounding verses. They argue that the pericope's appearance in the majority of manuscripts, if not in the oldest ones, is evidence of its authenticity.

Status in the Bible 
The Catholic Church regards it as canonical, following the precepts of the Council of Trent. Many Protestants, however, reject it as non-canonical. From a Protestant point of view, Baum argues that its canonicity can be "determined according to the same historical and content-related criteria that the ancient church applied during the development of the canon of Scriptures." He further argues, however, that it should be separated from the Gospel of John.

Art and culture 
The story is the subject of several paintings, including:

 Christ and the Woman Taken in Adultery by Pieter Bruegel the Elder (1565)
 The Woman Taken in Adultery by Rembrandt (1644)
 Christ and the Woman Taken in Adultery by Mattia Preti (c.1650)
 Christ and the Woman Taken in Adultery by Peter Paul Rubens (1899)
 Christ and the Woman Taken in Adultery by Max Beckmann (1917)
 Christ with the Adulteress by Han van Meegeren (1942), but sold as an original Vermeer

Variations of the story are told in the 1986 science fiction novel Speaker for the Dead by Orson Scott Card, as part of Letters to an Incipient Heretic by the character San Angelo.

In September 2020, the Chinese textbook  (Professional Ethics and Law) was alleged to inaccurately recount the story with a changed narrative in which Jesus stones the woman, while claiming to be a sinner:

The publisher claims that this was an inauthentic, unauthorized publication of its textbook.

See also
 List of New Testament verses not included in modern English translations

Notes

References

External links

 (NIV)
 (KJV)
 Pericope Adulterae in Manuscript Comparator — allows two or more New Testament manuscript editions' readings of the passage to be compared in side by side and unified views (similar to diff output)
The Pericope de Adultera Homepage Site dedicated to proving that the passage is authentic, with links to a wide range of scholarly published material on both sides about all aspects of this text, and dozens of new articles.
New Testament Virtual Manuscript Room, the manuscript portal provided by the Institute for New Testament Textual Research. This page provides direct access to the primary source material to confirm the evidence presented in the section Manuscript Evidence. 
Jesus and the Adulteress, a detailed study by Wieland Willker.
Concerning the Story of the Adulteress in the Eighth Chapter of John, list marginal notes from several versions, extended discussion taken from Samuel P. Tregelles, lists extended excerpts from An Account of the Printed Text of the Greek New Testament (London, 1854), F.H.A. Scrivener, A Plain Introduction to the Criticism of the New Testament (4th edition. London, 1894), Bruce Metzger, A Textual Commentary on the Greek New Testament (Stuttgart, 1971), Raymond E. Brown, The Gospel According to John (i–xii), in the Anchor Bible series (Garden City, New York: Doubleday, 1966).
The Woman Taken In Adultery (John 7:53–8:11), in defense of the pericope de adultera by Edward F. Hills, taken from chapter 6 of his book, The King James Version Defended, 4th edition (Des Moines: Christian Research Press, 1984).
Chris Keith, The Initial Location of the Pericope Adulterae in Fourfold Tradition
David Robert Palmer, John 5:3b and the Pericope Adulterae
John David Punch, THE PERICOPE ADULTERAE: THEORIES OF INSERTION & OMISSION

Biblical criticism
Doctrines and teachings of Jesus
Gospel episodes
Gospel of John
Women in the New Testament
Adultery
Second Temple